Pierre Jean Henri Didelot (12 May 1870 in Paris – 30 October 1941 in Alpes-Maritimes). He was a colonial administrator in various colonies of the French Colonial Empire.

Titles held

References

1870 births
1941 deaths
French colonial governors and administrators
Governors of French India
People of French West Africa